Dah (also spelled Da) is a village in western Ivory Coast. It is in the sub-prefecture of Bangolo, Bangolo Department, Guémon Region, Montagnes District.

From 2008 to 2012, Dah was in the commune of Dah-Zagna. In March 2012, Dah-Zagna became one of 1126 communes nationwide that were abolished.

Notes

Populated places in Montagnes District
Populated places in Guémon